The 2004 Louisiana–Lafayette Ragin' Cajuns football team represented the University of Louisiana at Lafayette as a member of the Sun Belt Conference in the 2004 NCAA Division I-A football season. They were led by third-year head coach Rickey Bustle and played their home games at Cajun Field in Lafayette, Louisiana.

Schedule

Game summaries

Northwestern State

at Louisiana Tech

at Kansas State

Middle Tennessee

Florida International

New Mexico State

Idaho

Arkansas State

North Texas

Troy

Louisiana-Monroe

References

Louisiana–Lafayette
Louisiana Ragin' Cajuns football seasons
Louisiana–Lafayette Ragin' Cajuns football